Fabia is a female given name derived from the male names Fabius, Fabian or Fabio. It may be related to the Fabia gens of the Romans. The name may refer to:

Fabia Drake (1904–1990), British actress
Fabia Eudokia (580–612), Byzantine empress
Fabia Numantina, Roman noblewoman
Fabia Orestilla, Roman noblewoman
Fabia Trabaldo (born 1972), Italian athlete

See also
Fabia (disambiguation)

Feminine given names
Italian feminine given names